Sophia Lombardo (born September 14, 1955) is a former Italian actress.

Biography 
Lombardo started her career when she was young. She appeared in Italian style sex comedies and also in Spaghetti Western movies. She is best known for the role of teacher Mazzacurati in two films of the saga of Pierino: Pierino contro tutti (1981) and Pierino colpisce ancora (1982). She retired from the world of cinema in 1987.

Filmography 
 Due sul pianerottolo (1975)
 Sex with a Smile II (Spogliamoci così, senza pudor) (1976)
 La segretaria privata di mio padre (1976)
 Classe mista (1976)
 The Virgo, the Taurus and the Capricorn (La vergine, il toro e il capricorno) (1977)
 Mannaja (1977)
 Sugar, Honey and Pepper (Zucchero, miele e peperoncino) (1980)
 Pierino contro tutti (1981)
 L'esercito più pazzo del mondo (1981)
 Crime at the Chinese Restaurant (Delitto al ristorante cinese) (1981)
 Manolesta (1981)
 Pierino colpisce ancora (1982)
 Sogni mostruosamente proibiti (1982)
 Zero in condotta (1983)
 A me mi piace (1985)
 Fotoromanzo (1986)
 Detective School Dropouts (Asilo di polizia) (1986)
 Animali metropolitani (1987)

External links

1955 births
Living people
Italian film actresses